Hireulligeri is a village in Belgaum district in the southern state of Karnataka, India. It's in the main road between Saundatti and Dharwad. It is 9 km from Saundatti and 25 km from Dharwad. Sangolli family is very well known in this place.
shree veerabhadreshwara and karemma devi temples are famous here.

References

Villages in Belagavi district